The 1922 United States Senate election in Mississippi was held on November 7, 1922. Incumbent Democratic U.S. Senator John Sharp Williams did not run for re-election to a third term in office.

In the Democratic primary to succeed Williams, U.S. Representative Hubert D. Stephens defeated former Senator James K. Vardaman, who had held Mississippi's other Senate seat for one term. The race required a run-off, as neither candidate achieved a majority in the August primary with suffragette Belle Kearney in the race. 

Stephens's victory in the September 5 run-off was tantamount to election; he faced only nominal opposition from the Republican and Socialist candidates in the November general election.

Democratic primary

Candidates
Belle Kearney, suffragette and temperance lecturer
Hubert D. Stephens, former U.S. Representative from New Albany
James K. Vardaman, former U.S. Senator (1913–19) and Governor (1904–08)

Former Senator James Vardaman joined the race in June.

Campaign
Vardaman was condemned by former President Woodrow Wilson, who had engineered his defeat in 1918 over his opposition to American involvement in World War I. Wilson emphatically denounced Vardaman in a single sentence, stating, "I think he is thoroughly false and untrustworthy and that it would be a great detriment to Mississippi and the nation if he should be returned to the Senate." Vardaman responded with a lengthy statement attributing Wilson's opposition to their long-standing enmity.

Belle Kearney, among the first women to run for Senate anywhere in the country, encountered opposition from both men and women. One politician was quoted as saying, "When I cast my ballot for a woman, you can rest assured she is going to be a good-looking one and not so damn old as Miss Belle." Other former suffragettes privately withheld support based on past experience with Kearney. Nellie Nugent Somerville told a friend that Kearney "would never get [her] vote" because she had "worried and hindered legislative work." Nevertheless, she received a rare endorsement from the state League of Women Voters.

Results

Runoff
In the run-off, held September 5, both candidates vied for Kearney's primary voters, many of whom were women voting in a primary for the first time. Ultimately, Kearney threw her support behind Stephens, and her voters were credited with defeating the Vardaman machine in Mississippi.

General election

Results

See also 
 1922 United States Senate elections

References

Further reading

1922
Mississippi
1922 Mississippi elections